The Restout family was a French dynasty of painters from Normandy, including the painters:

 Marguerin Restout and his sons:
 Marc Restout (1616–1684) and his sons:
 Jacques Restout (1650–1701)
 Eustache Restout (1655–1743), also an architect and engraver
 Thomas Restout (1671–1754)
 Jean I Restout (1666–1702), and his sons:
 Jean II Restout (1692–1768)
 Jean-Bernard Restout (1732–1797)

17th-century French painters
French male painters
18th-century French painters
French families
Surnames of Norman origin
18th-century French male artists